Kulap Tukta Vilaysack is an American actress, comedian, writer, director, and showrunner. She co-hosts the Add To Cart podcast with SuChin Pak on Lemonada Media. She was the co-host of the Who Charted? podcast on the Earwolf network from 2010 until 2018.

Early life
Vilaysack was born in Washington, D.C. after her Laotian parents arrived from a refugee camp in Thailand. Her family soon moved to the Twin Cities, settling in the suburb of Eagan, Minnesota. She has two younger sisters, Anita and Alyssa.

After graduating from high school, Vilaysack moved to Los Angeles where she attended the Fashion Institute of Design & Merchandising and received an associate's degree. She later took classes and performed at the Upright Citizens Brigade Theatre in Los Angeles. She was also a producer of the Los Angeles/Silverlake-based alternative comedy variety show, "Garage Comedy".

Career

Vilaysack's acting work includes a recurring role as "Nurse Kulap" on the Adult Swim series Childrens Hospital.  Other television guest appearances include Bob's Burgers, The Office, The Sarah Silverman Program, The Hotwives of Orlando, Parks and Recreation, Happy Endings, Reno 911! and Whitney. In 2007, she briefly worked as an associate producer on America's Got Talent.

With comedian Howard Kremer, she co-hosted the podcast Who Charted? on the Earwolf network from 2010 to 2018.

Vilaysack is the creator and showrunner of the reality show spoof Bajillion Dollar Propertie$, her first time working in this capacity. The show premiered in early 2016 as part of the launch of NBC's streaming platform Seeso. Other executive producers on the project include Scott Aukerman, Robert Ben Garant, and Thomas Lennon.

In October 2020, it was announced that Vilaysack would be joining Lemonada Media's podcast slate as the co-host of the new show Add to Cart alongside former MTV News correspondent SuChin Pak. The podcast launched on November 17, 2020 and is "a subversive and fun way about talking about consumerism, and how we all participate in it."

Personal life

Vilaysack married comedian Scott Aukerman in 2008. In 2022 Vilaysack and Aukerman had a daughter, Emerald.

She directed a documentary about her family tree entitled Origin Story which premiered on Amazon on May 10, 2019. The film incorporates the character Katharsis of The Movement, a superhero based on Vilaysack created by author Gail Simone.

Other
Vilaysack and comedian June Diane Raphael are the founders and directors of the Upright Citizens Brigade Theater (UCB)-associated "UCB Corps" community, a volunteer charity organization. Vilaysack and Raphael organize charity events and projects to help improve the community, with the help of volunteers and other UCB performers "who want to make our world a better place".

Filmography

References

External links

 
 

1980 births
21st-century American actresses
Actresses from Minnesota
Actresses from Washington, D.C.
American people of Laotian descent
American podcasters
American stage actresses
American television actresses
American women comedians
American writers of Laotian descent
Living people
People from Eagan, Minnesota
Upright Citizens Brigade Theater performers
21st-century American comedians
American women podcasters